The 2022 Fast5 Netball World Series was the tenth staging of the Fast5 Netball World Series, and the seventh to be played under the Fast5 rules, which replaced the older fastnet rules introduced in 2009. The tournament was held in New Zealand for the fourth time. The host city Christchurch was awarded hosting rights for the 2022 and 2023 tournaments, with matches played at the Christchurch Arena.

The 2022 tournament marked the return of this format to international netball since 2018, with a men's competition also held for the first time.

Host nation New Zealand entered the tournament as defending champions, having won the competition seven times.

Overview

Format
22 matches are played over two days, under the Fast5 rules of netball. Each team plays each other once during the first two days in a round-robin format. The two highest-scoring teams from this stage progress to the Grand Final while the remaining teams contest the third-fourth place playoff match and fifth-sixth place playoff match.

Teams
The tournament was contested by the six top national netball teams in the world, according to the World Netball Rankings:
 
 
 
 
 
 

Men's competition
 Australia
 New Zealand
 England

Squads

Fixtures

Round-robin

Finals

Final Placings

|

Men's Competition

References

External Links
 Fast5 Netball
 World Netball – Fast5 Netball World Series

2022
2022 in netball
International netball competitions hosted by New Zealand
2022 in Australian netball
2022 in New Zealand netball
2022 in English netball
2022 in South African women's sport
2022 in Ugandan sport
2022 in Jamaican sport
November 2022 sports events in New Zealand